The Surrogacy Arrangements Act 1985 (c. 49) is an Act of the Parliament of the United Kingdom that prohibits commercial surrogacy arrangements. It received Royal Assent on 16 July 1985.

The Act came about as a response to the birth, on 4 January 1985, of Britain's first commercial surrogate baby amid a widespread public outcry.

The Act was amended by the Human Fertilisation and Embryology Act 1990 (so that surrogate mothers can always keep the baby if they change their mind) and the Human Fertilisation and Embryology Act 2008.

From 1996-1998 Margaret Brazier chaired a review of surrogacy arrangements. It made a number of recommendations including that only expenses, including loss of earnings, should be paid to surrogate mothers, and that all surrogacy agencies should be registered with the Department of Health.

References

External links

United Kingdom Acts of Parliament 1985
Family law in the United Kingdom
Surrogacy